Deepwater Black is a 1992 novel, first in the Deepwater trilogy, by the New Zealand science fiction writer Ken Catran, where a cast of young characters are supposedly stranded in space while a virus ravages Earth.  The book series itself is quite different from the television series later developed. The approach of the novels focused on the characters as younger children, around 13-14 rather than the television approach where the characters were much older.

Plot 
The main plot involved a virus that breaks out and leaves the humans residing on Earth doomed. However, in a desperate attempt before the end, all humanity's resources are dedicated to a crash program to produce a deep space ark, capable of seeding humanity on a new world.  The ship is crewed by six clones; teenage versions of people who achieved great works during the ark project and equipped with the memories of their donors.  Prior to its arrival, however, the crew is awoken prematurely to face a threat to the ship, before their memories are complete.  They must come to terms with the workings of the ship, the dangers faced by their ship, the realization that they are clones, and their ultimate destiny to save their race.

TV series 
The trilogy was adapted as the Sci Fi Channel's first original scripted television series in 1997 under the name Mission Genesis. The series was a co-production between YTV Network, USA Networks and was distributed by Sunbow Entertainment. In Canada and the United Kingdom, the series retained the original title, Deepwater Black.  Only one season of 13 episodes was made, and involved a relatively small cast and heavy use of CGI.  Soon after production ended, lead actress Nicole de Boer joined the cast of Star Trek: Deep Space Nine and lead actor Gordon Michael Woolvett joined the cast of Andromeda.

The series was filmed in Toronto, Ontario, Canada.

Music for the series composed and performed by Fred Mollin.

Cast 
 Gordon Michael Woolvett - Reb (captain and engineer)
 Nicole de Boer - Yuna (pilot and navigator)
 Jason Cadieux - Bren (defense and weapons expert)
 Julie Khaner - Gen (onboard computer)
 Craig Kirkwood - Zak (computer and cybernetics technician)
 Sara Sahr - Lise (doctor)
 Kelli Taylor - Gret (geneticist and communications expert)

Episodes
The show only had 13 episodes before it was canceled. They were:

References

External links 
 
 Plot Guide for Deepwater Black (note: currently no actual plot synopsis are on the site.)
 YTV webpage for Deepwater Black (ARCHIVED

1995 novels
1995 children's books
New Zealand children's books
New Zealand science fiction novels
Children's science fiction novels
1995 science fiction novels
Post-apocalyptic novels
Syfy original programming
YTV (Canadian TV channel) original programming
Post-apocalyptic television series
Television series by Sony Pictures Television
Television series by Sunbow Entertainment
Television shows filmed in Toronto
1997 American television series debuts
1997 American television series endings
1990s American science fiction television series
20th-century New Zealand novels